Uroxite is an oxalate mineral first discovered as part of the Carbon Mineral Challenge. It is the first discovered uranium-containing organic mineral.

References

Minerals
Organic minerals
Monoclinic minerals
Oxalate minerals
Minerals described in 2020